Ancistrus jataiensis is a species of catfish in the family Loricariidae. It is a freshwater species native to South America, where it is only known from córrego Jataí, which is a small tributary of the Vermelho River in the Tocantins River basin in Brazil. The species reaches 5.4 cm (2.1 inches) SL.

References 

jataiensis
Fish described in 2005
Fauna of Brazil